"Coachella – Woodstock In My Mind" is a trap song written by American songwriters Lana Del Rey and Rick Nowels. The song was recorded by Del Rey and placed on her fifth studio album Lust for Life. It was released on May 15, 2017 as a promotional single from the album.

Del Rey wrote the song after attending the Coachella Valley Music Festival in April 2017. The song was written out of guilt of the enjoyment of the festival, during a time tension between the United States and North Korea which began in 2017.

Background and writing
The song was first announced on the Arabic streaming service Anghami on May 13, 2017. The song was then released as a promotional single from Lust for Life on May 15, 2017.

Del Rey wrote the song and posted a video of herself on Instagram singing a short snippet of it on April 17, 2017. She recorded the video after attending the 2017 Coachella Valley Music and Arts Festival in Indio, California, and she captioned the video saying: I'm not gonna lie- I had complex feelings about spending the weekend dancing whilst watching tensions w North Korea mount. I find It's a tightrope between being vigilantly observant of everything going on in the world and also having enough space and time to appreciate God's good earth the way it was intended to be appreciated. On my way home I found myself compelled to visit an old favorite place of mine at the rim of the world highway where I took a moment to sit down by the sequoia grove and write a little song. I just wanted to share this in hopes that one individual's hope and prayer for peace might contribute to the possibility of it in the long run. Hope everyone has a nice day, with love from California.

Composition 
"Coachella – Woodstock in My Mind" has been described by The Guardian as a "sedated trap track". It is a ballad that Exclaim! has described as "an electronic spin on Lana's classic torch-song style". The song's chorus is a "lyrical hat-tip" to "Stairway to Heaven" by Led Zeppelin.

Credits and personnel
Credits adapted from Tidal.
 Lana Del Rey – vocals, production, composition
 Rick Nowels – production, celesta, mellotron, composition, synthesizer programmer
 Dean Reid – production, engineering, mixing, drums, bass guitar, flute, synthesizer programmer
 Kieron Menzies – production, engineering, mixing, drums, keyboard, magnetic tape realization, percussion
 Chris Garcia – engineering
 Trevor Yasuda – keyboard, engineering
 Adam Ayan – mastering engineer

Charts

See also
 List of anti-war songs

References

External links
 Lana Del Rey - Coachella – Woodstock In My Mind

2017 songs
2017 singles
Interscope Records singles
Lana Del Rey songs
Polydor Records singles
Songs written by Lana Del Rey
Songs written by Rick Nowels
Song recordings produced by Lana Del Rey
Song recordings produced by Rick Nowels
Trap music songs
2010s ballads
Anti-war songs
Coachella Valley
Songs about California